In United States aviation VFR-on-top is defined as air traffic control authorization for an aircraft operating under instrument flight rules (IFR) to do so in visual meteorological conditions (VMC) at any appropriate visual flight rules (VFR) altitude. A pilot receiving this authorization must comply with the VFR visibility, distance from cloud criteria, and the minimum IFR altitudes. The use of this term does not relieve controllers of their responsibility to separate aircraft in Class B and Class C airspace or TRSAs.

See also
VFR over-the-top

References

91.179(A) §91.179 IFR cruising altitude or flight level. – US Government Publishing Office

Air traffic control